Tatyana Petrovna Alekseyeva (born 7 October 1963) is a former 400 metres sprinter from Novosibirsk, Russia. Her personal best result was 49.98. She retired from international competition after 1998. A three-time individual Russian national champion, she won 400 m silver medals at the IAAF World Indoor Championships and European Athletics Indoor Championships. With the Russian 4 × 400 metres relay team, she set an indoor world record to win gold at the 1997 IAAF World Indoor Championships and set the Russian record of 3:18.38 as silver medallist at the 1993 World Championships in Athletics.

Career
Alekseyeva was a double gold medallist for the Soviet Union at the 1985 Summer Universiade, taking both individual and relay 400 m titles. She competed at the 1985 IAAF World Cup that year and shared in a relay silver medal with Irina Nazarova, Mariya Pinigina and Olha Bryzhina. She was chosen as the heats runner for the 4 × 400 metres relay at the 1991 World Championships in Athletics and helped the Soviet team to the final, where they took a silver medal.

Running a Russian indoor record of 51.03 seconds, Alekseyeva was the 400 m silver medalist at the 1993 IAAF World Indoor Championships. She also won a gold in the 4 × 400 metres relay, alongside Marina Shmonina, Yelena Andreyeva, and Yelena Ruzina, but the team was stripped of the titles due to doping by Shmonina. At the 1993 World Championships in Athletics she narrowly missed out on an individual medal, taking fourth behind Jamaica's Sandie Richards, but left the competition with a silver medal through the Russian record-breaking relay team including Ruzina, Margarita Ponomaryova and Irina Privalova, which was runner-up to the United States with 3:18.38 minutes.

Alekseyeva was the 400 m runner-up at the 1994 European Athletics Indoor Championships. In her last year of international competition, she helped set a world indoor record in the 4 × 400 m relay, anchoring the team of Tatyana Chebykina, Svetlana Goncharenko and Olga Kotlyarova to top the podium at the 1997 IAAF World Indoor Championships in 3:26.84 minutes. She was an individual and relay finalist at the 1997 World Championships in Athletics.

At national level, she won one outdoor national title in the 400 m at the 1997 Russian Athletics Championships and two indoor titles at the Russian Indoor Athletics Championships (1993, 1994). She was runner-up in the 200 metres and 4 × 400 metres relay at the 1991 Soviet Athletics Championships and placed third in the 60 metres at the 1992 Russian Indoor Athletics Championships.

International competitions

National titles
Russian Athletics Championships
400 m: 1997
Russian Indoor Athletics Championships
400 m: 1993, 1994

See also
List of World Championships in Athletics medalists (women)
List of IAAF World Indoor Championships medalists (women)
List of European Athletics Indoor Championships medalists (women)

References

External links

1963 births
Living people
Sportspeople from Novosibirsk
Russian female sprinters
Soviet female sprinters
Universiade gold medalists in athletics (track and field)
Universiade gold medalists for the Soviet Union
Medalists at the 1985 Summer Universiade
World Athletics Championships athletes for the Soviet Union
World Athletics Championships athletes for Russia
World Athletics Championships medalists
World Athletics Indoor Championships medalists
World Athletics Indoor Championships winners
Russian Athletics Championships winners
World record setters in athletics (track and field)